"Bantams in Pine-Woods" is a poem from Wallace Stevens's first book of poetry, Harmonium. It was first published  in 1922 in the poetry journal Dial, along with five other poems, all under the title "Revue." It is in the public domain.

Interpretation
This poem can be read as a declaration of independence for American poetry. The new world's "inchling" poets are defiant towards the traditional literary canon, and particularly defiant against the unnamed, arrogant, self-appointed gatekeeper of literary tradition; they are confident instead in their own free powers of innovation in the New World.
The poem can be compared to "The Paltry Nude Starts on a Spring Voyage" on Helen Vendler's interpretation of it as an expression of confidence in new American art. In this reading, Chieftain Iffucan represents the canon, making a claim of universality and a privileged access to inspiration that is challenged by the Appalachian inchlings. The richness of tradition is conceded ("Fat!...."), but it is then relativized ("Your world is you").

Notes

References 

 Buttel, Robert. Wallace Stevens: The Making of Harmonium. 1967: Princeton University Press.
 Vendler, Helen. On Extended Wings. 1969: Harvard University Press.
 Cook, Eleanor. A Reader's Guide to Wallace Stevens. 2007: Princeton University Press.

1922 poems
American poems
Poetry by Wallace Stevens